Ornithine decarboxylase is an enzyme that in humans is encoded by the ODC1 gene.

This gene encodes the rate-limiting enzyme of the polyamine biosynthesis pathway which catalyzes ornithine to putrescine. The activity level for the enzyme varies in response to growth-promoting stimuli and exhibits a high turnover rate in comparison to other mammalian proteins. Originally localized to both chromosomes 2 and 7, the gene encoding this enzyme has been determined to be located on 2p25, with a pseudogene located on 7q31-qter.

Clinical significance 
Mutations of the ODC1 gene cause Bachmann-Bupp syndrome, a neurometabolic disorder characterized by global developmental delay, alopecia, macrocephaly, and dysmorphic features.

References

Further reading